Staroye Semyonkovo is a rural locality (a village) in Petushinskoye Rural Settlement, Petushinsky District, Vladimir Oblast, Russia. The population was 22 as of 2010. There are 4 streets.

Geography 
Staroye Semyonkovo is located 12 km northwest of Petushki (the district's administrative centre) by road. Novye Omutishchi is the nearest rural locality.

References 

Rural localities in Petushinsky District